(4 June 1876 – 26 May 1946) was a Japanese architect, and a colleague of Kingo Tatsuno.

References

Japanese architects
1876 births
1946 deaths
Place of birth missing
Place of death missing
People from Kanazawa, Ishikawa